The Borneo python (Python breitensteini), also known commonly as the Borneo short-tailed python, is a species of non-venomous snake in the family Pythonidae. The species is endemic to the island of Borneo.

Taxonomy
For a while considered a subspecies of Python curtus, P. breitensteini was re-elevated to a full species by Keogh, Barker and Shine (2001). The specific name, breitensteini, is in honor of Heinrich Breitenstein, a German physician and naturalist who collected amphibians and reptiles in Borneo.

Description
 

Adults of P. breitensteini have been reported to attain a total length (including tail) of 2.1 m (7 ft), although they are usually no more than 1.2 m (4 ft). Heavy-bodied, they can weigh as much as 13.6 kg (30 lb). Females are generally larger than males. The head is broad with several thermoreceptive pits along the nose. The tail is short and tapering.

The color pattern is usually tan with brown blotching, which varies greatly. Though no instances of albinism have been reported, a few individuals display a significantly lighter color, appearing more yellow than brown. Juveniles have a more contrasting pattern than adults. The head is usually yellow.

Distribution and habitat
On the island of Borneo, P. breitensteini is found in Brunei, Indonesia, and Malaysia. Typically, it is found at lower elevations, on poorly drained flood plains, or on the edges of swampy areas; man-made irrigation of farmland has also provided appropriate habitat.

Reproduction
P. breitensteini is oviparous.

Captivity
 
While the Borneo python generally has a reputation for being mean-tempered, this species is increasing in popularity among reptile enthusiasts because captive-bred specimens are recognized as easier to handle than wild-caught snakes.  Almost all of the early imported animals were animals originally caught for the skin trade.

References

Further reading

Das I (2006). A Photographic Guide to Snakes and other Reptiles of Borneo. Sanibel Island, Florida: Ralph Curtis Books. 144 pp. . (Python breitensteini, p. 16).
Keogh JS, Barker DG, Shine R (2001). "Heavily Exploited but Poorly Known: Systematics and Biogeography of Commercially Harvested Pythons (Python curtus group) in Southeast Asian". Biological Journal of the Linnean Society 73: 113-129.
Steindachner F (1880) ("1881"). "Über eine neue Pythonart (Python Breitensteini) aus Borneo". Sitzungberichte der Kaiserlichen Akademie der Wissenschaften. Mathematisch-Naturwissenschaftliche Classe. Abtheilung I. (Vienna) 82: 267-268. (Python breitensteini, new species).

External links

Python (genus)
Endemic fauna of Borneo
Fauna of Brunei
Reptiles of Indonesia
Reptiles of Malaysia
Reptiles described in 1880
Reptiles of Borneo